The women's K-4 500 metres event was a fours kayaking event conducted as part of the Canoeing at the 1996 Summer Olympics program.

Medalists

Results

Heats
16 crews entered in two heats. The top two finishers from each of the heats advanced directly to the finals while the remaining teams were relegated to the semifinals.

Semifinals
The top two finishers in each of the semifinals and the fastest third-place finisher advanced to the final.

Final
The final was held on August 3.

Fischer became the first woman in any sport to win Olympic gold medals 16 years apart. She won the women's K-1 500 m event at the 1980 Summer Olympics in Moscow.

References
1996 Summer Olympics official report Volume 3. pp. 168–9. 
Sports-reference.com women's 1996 K-4 500 m results.
Wallechinsky, David and Jaime Loucky (2008). "Canoeing: Women's Kayak Fours 500 Meters". In The Complete Book of the Olympics: 2008 Edition. London: Aurum Press Limited. p. 495.

Women's K-4 500
Olympic
Women's events at the 1996 Summer Olympics